'Matungulu Constituency is an electoral constituency within Machakos County, Kenya. It is one of eight constituencies in the county. It was created by Independent Electoral and Boundaries Commission (IEBC). It is home to Matungulu Stadium which is in its final stages of completion with an aim of nurturing local talents.

2013 election 

The constituency  was first represented in Parliament in March 2013 By Hon Stephen Mutinda Mule. A petition was filed in Machakos law courts where his election was nullified. Matungulu Constituents then went to by-elections on Oct 17th, 2013 and Mule of Wiper Democratic Movement- Kenya was re-elected where he garnered 11,867 votes marking a 43.83 percent of the total vote cast.

Thomas Musau of the New Democrats Party followed in second with 8,951 votes which represented a 33.7 percent. 
Former Kangundo MP Moffat Maitha of National Rainbow Coalition was third with 5,965 votes representing 22.46 percent of the total votes cast.

2022 Elections 

The incumbent Hon. Stephen Mutinda Mule is facing a stiff competition from Peter Kilonzo Mutiso (WasyaWaMatungulu) from Nguluni, Matungulu West Ward.  KILONZO is believed to be accepted across all ages. He is the man to watch all other aspirant are yet to come on board

County assembly wards

References 
 http://www.infotrackea.co.ke/services/leadership/constituencyinfo.php?cinf=wards&t=78
Mwana Mule
2013 Matungulu Constituency Petition against Hon. Mule
 Matungulu By-Elections

External links 

Constituencies in Machakos County
Constituencies in Eastern Province (Kenya)
2012 establishments in Kenya
Constituencies established in 2012